Riverside Historic District is a national historic district located at Elizabeth City, Pasquotank County, North Carolina. The district encompasses 68 contributing buildings and 1 contributing structure in a predominantly residential section of Elizabeth City.  The district developed after 1893, and includes representative examples of Greek Revival, Queen Anne, Colonial Revival, Bungalow / American Craftsman, and Tudor Revival style architecture. Notable contributing buildings include the Preyer-Cropsey-Outlaw House, Markham-Bell House, Bascom S. Sawyer House, Grover Hill House, Montgomery-Corbett House, Dr. Mora S. Bulla House, the W. Paul Jackson House, Jaccia F. Burrus House, Miles L. Clark House (c. 1926), and Calvary Baptist Church.

It was listed on the National Register of Historic Places in 1994.

References

Historic districts on the National Register of Historic Places in North Carolina
Greek Revival architecture in North Carolina
Tudor Revival architecture in North Carolina
Queen Anne architecture in North Carolina
Colonial Revival architecture in North Carolina
Houses in Pasquotank County, North Carolina
National Register of Historic Places in Pasquotank County, North Carolina